Saint-Étienne-sur-Chalaronne (literally Saint-Étienne on Chalaronne) is a commune in the Ain department in eastern France.

Geography
The Chalaronne flows northwest through the middle of the commune and crosses the village.

Population

See also
Communes of the Ain department

References

External links

 Dombes and Saint-Étienne-sur-Chalaronne

Communes of Ain
Ain communes articles needing translation from French Wikipedia